Fountain Valley High School (FVHS) is a public high school in Fountain Valley, California, USA. It was established in 1966 and is a part of the Huntington Beach Union High School District. It is notable for its rivalry with Edison High School, particularly during the American football season when both schools compete in the "Battle of the Bell".

For the first few years after opening, the school had a larger student population than any other high school west of the Mississippi with approximately 4,300 students. Due to the large student body, school days were split into two shifts, mornings for underclassmen and afternoons for upperclassmen. Over the years, enrollment decreased due to various factors, including the opening of Edison High School in 1969.

The athletic teams are known as the Barons and the school colors are red, blue and gold. The school had to renovate some of its buildings, which were sinking, starting in 2002. These renovations yielded new portable buildings in an area that was previously a parking lot. In 2006, these semi-permanent portable buildings were replaced with permanent facilities. In March 2011, the track and football field were renovated. The dirt track was replaced by a synthetic track and the field was replaced with new natural grass. The field has since been replaced by imitation grass and turf.

The school's marching band, called the "Royal Regiment", represented California at Ronald Reagan's 1981 inaugural parade. "When Johnny Comes Marching Home" was played by the marching band as hostages were released from the American embassy in Tehran.

In fall 1996, a scene from the 1997 film Wag the Dog was filmed at FVHS during a basketball game and used the 1997 graduating class as extras.

In March 2005, the school drumline and band was filmed in Gwen Stefani's "Hollaback Girl" music video.

In April 2007, the school was recognized as a California Distinguished School for the second consecutive time.

The school is renowned for its vocal music program and the advanced choir, called the "Troubadours", which has performed at conferences and conventions.

Leadership
List of principals:
 Paul Berger19661979 (founding principal)
 Larry Lucas19791980
 David Hagen19801985
 Mike Kasler19851991
 Gary Ernst19912000
 Connie Mayhugh20002004
 Chris Herzfeld20042014
 Kirk Kennedy20142015
 Morgan Smith20152021
 Paul Lopez2021present

Academics

Advanced placement
Fountain Valley High School has an advanced placement (or AP) program which allows high school students to study college-level course work. Nearly every AP course available is offered at FVHS.

Athletics
The school currently competes in the Sunset League and is a part of the California Interscholastic Federation Southern Section (CIF). Before 1974, the school competed in the Irvine League. The school fields all of the following sports: boys' baseball, basketball, cross country running, American football, golf, soccer, swim, tennis, track and field, volleyball, water polo and wrestling. On the girls' side, Fountain Valley fields the sports of basketball, cross country, field hockey, golf, soccer, softball, swimming, tennis, track and field, volleyball and water polo. In the past, there were gymnastics and badminton teams.

Fountain Valley High School has won 18 CIF Team Championships

 1973 Girls' swimming
 1977 Wrestling
 1978 American football
 1978 Gymnastics
 1980 Girls' gymnastics
 1981 Girls' gymnastics
 1981 Gymnastics
 1985 Baseball
 1985 Wrestling
 1988 Football
 1994 Baseball
 1995 Baseball
 1996 Girls' volleyball
 2005 Girls' cross country
 2015 Wrestling
 2018 Tennis
 2019 Wrestling
 2020 Wrestling

Fountain Valley has had two coaches and one athlete enshrined in the CIF hall of fame: Carol Strausberg (basketball coach), Ron LaRuffa (baseball coach) and Shirley Babashoff(swimmer).

The school also holds Five Counties Wrestling Championships, which is one of the biggest tournaments in the US. The wrestling team has won 29 League Champion titles (Irvine 1968, 1969, 1970, 1971, 1972, 1973 and 1974) (Sunset 1976, 1977, 1980, 1981, 1982, 1983, 1984, 1986, 1997, 1998, 2008, 2009, 2012, 2013, 2014, 2015, 2016, 2017, 2018, 2019, 2020 and 2021).
The American football game against rival Edison High School on December 11, 1980, was the fourth-highest attended game in state history with 28,968 fans in attendance. It was held at Anaheim Stadium, now known as Angel Stadium.

Notable alumni
 Summer Altice, actress and model
 Nicholas Arciniaga, 2013 USA marathon champion
 Shirley Babashoff, 1975, competition swimmer, Olympic champion
 Tara Lynne Barr, 2011, actress
 Craig Brewer, 1990, film director, producer, screenwriter
 Blake Davis, 2002, former Major League Baseball infielder for the Baltimore Orioles
 David Denman, actor
 Peter Girguis, 1971, professor at Harvard University in the Department of Organismic and Evolutionary Biology
 Kim Gruenenfelder, writer
 Luke Hudson, 1995, former Major League Baseball pitcher for the Cincinnati Reds and the Kansas City Royals
 Casey Janssen, 2000, former Major League Baseball pitcher for the Toronto Blue Jays and the Washington Nationals
 John Kosty, NCAA men's volleyball coach
 Ken Margerum, 1977, NFL wide receiver, college football coach. First Team All-America (Stanford), College Football Hall of Fame
 Michelle Pfeiffer, 1976, actress
 Chris Tillman, 2006, former Major League Baseball pitcher for the Baltimore Orioles
 Jasmine Tookes, model
 C.J. Wilson, 1998, former Major League Baseball pitcher for the Texas Rangers (baseball) and the Los Angeles Angels

References

External links
 
 District website

High schools in Orange County, California
Fountain Valley, California
Public high schools in California
Educational institutions established in 1966
1966 establishments in California